Fryderyk Getkant or Frederick Getkant (1600–1666) was a Prussian military engineer of Lithuanian descent, artillery lieutenant and cartographer, (born in Ragnit or according to other sources in Rhineland, Holy Roman Empire). He is also known as a first who had written down Lithuanian folk song with melody in 1634.

From the 1620s he worked in  Pomeranian Voivodeship – Polish–Lithuanian Commonwealth, on the problems of defence, especially those related to King Władysław IV Vasa short-time maritime interests (Polish–Lithuanian Commonwealth Navy).

Under the threat of Russian military invasion Getkant organised reconstruction of Vilnius military objects. He also prepared city plans for Kaunas, Tauragė and Virbalis.

Author of many plans, maps and atlases (especially of the lands near the Baltic Sea), among them, manuscript atlas of 15 military maps of grand fortresses and fortifications – Topographia practica conscripta et recognita per Fridericum Getkant, mechanicum (1638). Manuscript of his work covering mechanical and engineering aspects of his work was lost during the Lwów fire in 1662.

See also
Eliasz Arciszewski
Krzysztof Arciszewski
Ernest Braun
Kazimierz Siemienowicz

External links
Biography, in Polish

References

1600 births
1666 deaths
German cartographers
Lithuanian engineers
German military engineers
Polish military engineers
17th-century German engineers